The New York City Landmarks Preservation Commission (LPC), formed in 1965, is the New York City governmental commission that administers the city's Landmarks Preservation Law. Since its founding, it has designated over a thousand landmarks, classified into four categories: individual landmarks, interior landmarks, scenic landmarks, and historic districts.

The New York City borough of Manhattan contains numerous landmarks designated by the LPC, as well as seven scenic landmarks and several interior landmarks and historic districts. The following lists are split by geographical region.

List of New York City Designated Landmarks in Manhattan below 14th Street
List of New York City Designated Landmarks in Manhattan from 14th to 59th Streets
List of New York City Designated Landmarks in Manhattan from 59th to 110th Streets
List of New York City Designated Landmarks in Manhattan above 110th Street
List of New York City Designated Landmarks in Manhattan on Islands

See also
National Register of Historic Places listings in Manhattan below 14th Street
National Register of Historic Places listings in Manhattan from 14th to 59th Streets
National Register of Historic Places listings in Manhattan from 59th to 110th Streets
National Register of Historic Places listings in Manhattan above 110th Street
National Register of Historic Places listings in Manhattan on islands

External links
NYC Landmarks Preservation Commission
NYC Landmarks Designation Reports
New York City Landmarks Preservation Commission flickr Group

Landmarks Preservation Commission